The 2015–16 Toledo Rockets Huskies men's basketball team represented the University of Toledo during the 2015–16 NCAA Division I men's basketball season. The Rockets, led by sixth year head coach Tod Kowalczyk, played their home games at Savage Arena, as members of the West Division of the Mid-American Conference. They finished the season 17–15, 8–10 in MAC play to finish in fifth place in the West Division. They lost in the first round of the MAC tournament to Eastern Michigan.

Previous season
The Rockets finished the season 20–13, 11–7 in MAC play to finish in second place in the West Division. They advanced to the semifinals of the MAC tournament where they lost to Central Michigan. Despite having 20 wins, they were not invited to a postseason tournament.

Departures

Incoming Transfers

Recruiting class of 2015

Roster

Schedule
Source: 

|-
!colspan=9 style="background:#000080; color:#F9D819;"| Exhibition

|-
!colspan=9 style="background:#000080; color:#F9D819;"| Non-conference regular season

|-
!colspan=9 style="background:#000080; color:#F9D819;"| MAC regular season

|-
!colspan=9 style="background:#000080; color:#F9D819;"| MAC tournament

References

Toledo
Toledo Rockets men's basketball seasons